Phyllis Eleanor Bentley  (19 November 1894 – 27 June 1977) was an English novelist.

Biography
The youngest child of a mill owner, she grew up in Halifax in the West Riding of Yorkshire and was educated at Halifax High School for Girls and Cheltenham Ladies' College. During World War I, she worked in the munitions industry. After the war, she returned to her native Halifax where she taught English and Latin.

In 1918, she published her first work, a collection of short stories entitled The World's Bane, after which she published several poor-selling novels until the publication in March 1932 of her best-known work, Inheritance, set against the background of the development of the textile industry in the West Riding, which received widespread critical acclaim and ran through twenty-three impressions by 1946, making her the first successful English regional novelist since Thomas Hardy had written his Wessex novels.

Bentley was a literary celebrity in the 1930s: in 1938 she gave the first in a series of 'Manchester Celebrity Lectures' on the subject 'Writing a novel'.

Two further novels followed in 1946 and 1966, forming a trilogy, and in 1967 Inheritance was filmed by Granada TV, with John Thaw and James Bolam in leading roles. In 1968, she wrote the children's novel Gold Pieces, which is a fictionalised account, seen through the eyes of a twelve-year-old boy, of the Cragg Coiners, who defrauded the government by clipping the edges of gold coins to melt down and make into new coins.

Bentley wrote 24 detective short stories featuring Miss Marian Phipps, beginning with "The Missing Character" for Woman's Home Companion in 1937 and continuing in Ellery Queen's Mystery Magazine from the early 1950s to the early 1970s.  A collection appeared in book form in 2014.

In 1949 she was made an honorary Doctor of Letters from Leeds University. In 1958, she became a Fellow of the Royal Society of Literature, and in 1970, she was appointed an OBE.

Selected works
1918 The World's Bane (four allegorical stories)
1922 Environment (novel)
1923 Cat in the Manger (novel)
1928 The Spinner of the Years (novel)
1928 The Partnership (novel)
1929 Carr (novel)
1930 Trio (novel)
1932 Inheritance (novel)
1934 A Modern Tragedy (novel)
1935 The Whole of the Story (short stories)
1936 Freedom Farewell (study of the fall of Ancient Rome, her only fictional work not concerned with Yorkshire)
1941 Manhold (novel)
1942 The English Regional Novel
1945 We of the West Riding (scriptwriter)
1946 The Rise of Henry Morcar (novel) (part two of the Inheritance Trilogy)
1947 The Brontës (biography)
1950 Quorum
1953 The House of Moreys (novel)
1954 The Coiners (televised play)
1955 Noble in Reason (novel)
1958 Crescendo (novel)
1960 The Young Brontës (biography)
1962 O Dreams O Destinations (autobiography)
1966 A Man of His Time (novel) (part three of the Inheritance Trilogy)
1968 Gold Pieces (children's novel)
1969 Ring in the New (update of the Inheritance Trilogy)
1969 The Brontës and Their World (biography)
1972 Sheep May Safely Graze (novel)
1974 Tales of West Riding (short stories)
2014 Chain of Witnesses, The Cases of Miss Phipps (short detective stories, published by Crippen & Landru)

In addition to her fiction works, her non-fiction work included scholarly works on the Brontë Sisters, the English woollen industry as well as West Riding history and topography.

References

External links
 
 
 
 Article about Phyllis Bentley: "Phyllis Bentley: novelist of Yorkshire life" by Eric Ford, first published in the Contemporary Review
 "The Photograph" a short story by Phyllis Bentley, published in the Persephone Biannually
 http://genome.ch.bbc.co.uk/schedules/bbctv/1954-06-24

1894 births
1977 deaths
English women novelists
People from Halifax, West Yorkshire
People educated at Cheltenham Ladies' College
Fellows of the Royal Society of Literature
Officers of the Order of the British Empire
People educated at North Halifax Grammar School
20th-century English novelists
20th-century English women writers
English historical novelists
Women historical novelists